The Naju Na clan is one of the Korean clans. Their bon-gwan is in Naju, South Jeolla Province. According to research as of 2000, there were approximately 108,139 members of the Naju Na clan. Na Bu settled in Naju, which became the clan's bon-gwan.

See also 
 Korean clan names of foreign origin

References

External links 
 

 
Korean clan names of Chinese origin
Na clans